
Gmina Santok is a rural gmina (administrative district) in Gorzów County, Lubusz Voivodeship, in western Poland.

Villages
Gmina Santok contains the villages and settlements of Baranowice, Czechów, Górki, Gralewo, Janczewo, Jastrzębnik, Lipki Małe, Lipki Wielkie, Ludzisławice, Mąkoszyce, Nowe Polichno, Płomykowo, Santok, Stare Polichno and Wawrów.

Neighbouring gminas
Gmina Santok is bordered by the city of Gorzów Wielkopolski and by the gminas of Deszczno, Drezdenko, Kłodawa, Skwierzyna, Strzelce Krajeńskie and Zwierzyn.

Twin towns – sister cities

Gmina Santok is twinned with:
 Gusow-Platkow, Germany

References

Santok
Gorzów County